Koji Kobayashi may refer to:
Kōji Kobayashi (boxer) (born 1957), Japanese boxer
Koji Kobayashi (water polo), Japanese water polo player, who participated in Water polo at the 2010 Asian Games – Men
Koji Kobayashi (engineer), engineer and namesake of an IEEE Founders Medal
Koji Kobayashi, character in Godzilla Raids Again
Koji Kobayashi (corporate executive), vice president of Toyota Motor corporation